Yoseikan Aikido (養正館合気道 Yoseikan Aikidō) is the aikido taught at the Yoseikan Dojo in Shizuoka, Japan, under the direction of Minoru Mochizuki (望月 稔 Mōchizuki Minoru, 1907–2003).

Mochizuki was a direct student of aikido's founder, Morihei Ueshiba.  He was an uchi deshi (live-in student) from around November 1930, to around August 1931. Mochizuki maintained contact with Ueshiba until the latter's death in 1969.

In the 1970s Yoseikan Aikido was formally organised into Yoseikan Budo along with the other arts Mochizuki had studied and mastered, including judo, karate, Tenshin Shoden Katori Shinto-ryu, jujutsu, kobudo, iaido, kendo, jojutsu, and Mongolian kempo.  However, some dojos still exist throughout the world that maintain their art as Aikido, and as such, still refer to it as Yoseikan Aikido, or Yoseikan Aikijujutsu/ Aikijutsu.

Summary
Traditionally Yoseikan Aikido contains all the aspects present in other aikido schools, for example ai (harmony), ki (energy), kokyu (breath), seika-no-itten (one point), irimi (entering), and tenkan (turning).  Other important aspects from judo are also included, including kuzushi (unbalancing), tsukuri (positioning), jita kyoei (mutual welfare and prosperity), sei ryoku zen yo (maximum efficiency).

Due to Mochizuki’s fighting experiences when introducing martial arts in France in the 1950s he felt that aikido needed a stronger technical basis to ‘meet all challengers.’  In essence all judo techniques can be thought of as Yoseikan Aikido techniques.  In reality, this only adds several core judo techniques, such as hip throws, shoulder throws (which exist in other aikido schools), sacrifice throws, and foot sweeps.  Many in the aikido community see the ideas of foot sweeps and sacrifice throws as contrary to the core principles of aikido, where balance and being centred are paramount.  These techniques, however, do not result in a loss of centre or balance.  Fundamentally, the foot sweeping techniques in Yoseikan Aikido are identical to otoshi waza (dropping techniques) in other aikido schools.  The use of the foot ensures the technique is effective, even when the opponent is resisting. Less emphasis is then placed on timing, and more importantly, an overcommitted attack is not required.  As for sacrifice throws, a fundamental principle used in Yoseikan Aikido is gyokushin, or the spirit of a ball.  Even when a ball rolls it maintains its centre, and that is true of the Yoseikan Aikidoka when performing sacrifice throws.  You do not need to be on your feet to move spherically, which is important in the application of aikido techniques.

Sincerity is another aspect which greatly influences Yoseikan Aikido.  It is for this reason that Yoseikan Aikido includes basics, combinations and fundamental kata from karate Do.  This makes sure that uke (the attacker) in Yoseikan is as effective and sincere in attack, as nage (the thrower) will become in defence. Before World War II, aikido students were required to have previously studied martial arts, and have a letter of reference from their instructor.  This meant that all pre-war students already possessed basic skills of uke (the attacker), including falling and striking.  Now, aikido may be taken as a first art. Therefore, in Yoseikan students are taught how to attack.

Put simply, the main difference between Yoseikan, and other schools is the way Mochizuki sensei structured his teachings, and hence the way aikido was taught at the Yoseikan.  Yoseikan has a very logical structure, which can be seen as a fundamental influence of Jigoro Kano, who stressed the science of judo.  More emphasis is placed on fundamentals, such as escaping from a grab.  These techniques are typically mentioned in other aikido schools, and are the first part of a locking or throwing technique.  However, in Yoseikan Aikido they are drilled and examined as basics. After its construction in 1931, Morihei Ueshiba visited, supervised, and taught at the Yoseikan, and Mochizuki was awarded his 8th Dan in the 1950s (10th Dan awarded later by the IMAF with the approval of Kisshomaru Ueshiba), as well as obtaining scrolls in Aikijujutsu from Ueshiba in the 1930s, hence, his method was approved.

History

Japan 
In October 1930 after witnessing a demonstration of Morihei Ueshiba, Jigoro Kano organised (in a formal letter to Ueshiba) for two students to study under him.  These two men were, Jiro Takeda and Minoru Mochizuki.  With his previous knowledge in judo, jujutsu, kendo and kenjutsu, Mochizuki rapidly progressed under Ueshiba.  He was appointed supervisor of the uchi deshi, and also served as a teaching assistant, Ueshiba even suggested that Mochizuki marry his daughter and hence become his successor.  Mochizuki was an uchi deshi under Ueshiba for several months.  In mid to late 1931, Mochizuki fell ill with pleurisy and pulmonary tuberculosis.  During his 3-month hospital stay the Yoseikan dojo was constructed for Mochizuki.  Ueshiba, who was at the official opening of the Yoseikan in November 1931, regularly taught seminars at the dojo.

In June 1932, Ueshiba awarded Mochizuki with two Daito Ryu scrolls.  The first (in Daito Ryu order) was the Hiden Ogi no Koto and the second was the Goshinyo no Te.  In Daito Ryu, one learns the Hiden Mokuroku, then the Aiki no Jutsu, then the Hiden Ogi, and then the Goshinyo no Te.   After attaining these four levels, the person is then qualified to teach the art.  After these levels comes Kaishaku Soden and then finally Menkyo Kaiden.  In terms of Daito Ryu, Mochizuki was qualified to teach all that he had learnt up the Goshinyo no Te.  It is also worth noting that this is the technical level Ueshiba had achieved in Daito Ryu, although he held the official title Kyoju Dairi in Daito Ryu. This enabled Ueshiba to give instruction and travel to teach as a representative of the headmaster, Sokaku Takeda.

Aikido at the Yoseikan continued to develop until 1972, when after returning from France, Mochizuki had decided to change the name to Yoseikan Budo.  This also resulted in technical restructuring and the amalgamation of the once separate arts Mochizuki taught under a single term.  The characteristics of Mochizuki's Yoseikan Budo was still in essence aikido, with the addition of more Judo techniques, specifically ground work, the development of more sacrifice throws, and the inclusion Katori Shinto Ryu in higher grades.

Today the Yoseikan in Japan is home to the Seifukai, an organisation headed by Mochizuki's son Tetsuma.  They maintain a strong affinity to the primarily aikido based Budo of Minoru Mochizuki.

France 
In 1951, Mochizuki travelled to France mainly to teach judo, but he also found time to give instruction in aikido and is therefore credited with being the first to disseminate aikido abroad.  Europe's introduction to aikido and its association with judo came about directly due to the early activities of Mochizuki.  He was to set a pattern that would be repeated in most European countries where aikido would cast its roots within the existing judo community.  A large number of early European practitioners were judoka who were past their competitive years and found the graceful techniques of aikido to be a perfect alternative allowing them to continue active martial arts practice.  Mochizuki spent a total of two-and-one-half years in France and his efforts sowed the seeds for the development of the world's largest aikido population outside Japan.  It is said that today there are more than fifty thousand active practitioners in France!

Yoseikan Aikido from Yoseikan Ryu was represented by Jim Alcheik in France in the 50'. He founded the FFATKJ, with the agreement of Minoru Mochizuki, the "Fédération française d'Aikido, de Tai-jitsu et de Kendo" (FFATK) when he came back from Japan with Hiroo Mochizuki. Jim Alcheik called this art "aikido yoseikan" or "aikido ju-jitsu" or "Tai-jitsu". Jim Alcheik died in 1962 in a bomb attack in Algeria. French and European Tai-jitsu is considered as a "cousin discipline" of martial arts taught in Yoseikan Ryu.

Italy 

In the late 1950s Aikido Yoseikan was the first style of Aikido to be taught in Italy. The Italian Aikido Federation was established, chaired by the lawyer Ezio Viarana and whose technical director was the master Murakami Tetsuji (1927 - 1987), a pupil of Mochizuki Shihan. Subsequently, in the first half of the 1960s, an elderly student of Mochizuki Shihan arrived in Italy, the master Sugiyama Shoji (1933 - 2017), who settled in Turin where he opened the Dojo Sugiyama and began teaching Aikido Yoseikan. After the death of Mochizuki Shihan, the master Sugiyama, his senior pupil, developed the Yoseikan Aikijujitsu Sugiyama-ha method: this method has been recognized by the FIJLKAM (Italian Federation of Judo, Wrestling, Karate and Martial Arts) and is actually taught in Italian Dojos.

United States 
The legitimate start of Yoseikan Aikido in the US was through Capt. Sadayuki Demizu of the Japanese Air Self Defense Force. As Liaison Officer for Japanese students at the missile school at Redstone Arsenal in Huntsville, Alabama, Demizu was a 4th dan in Yoseikan Aikido, mostly trained by Kyoichi Murai, but a direct student and son-in-law of Minoru Mochizuki.  When Huntsville officers learned that Demizu was an aikido man, they asked him to begin teaching and he agreed. Among the first students was Thomas E. Bearden (then Captain, US Army—later retired as Lt. Col.).  Glenn Pack, now the technical director of the United States Yoseikan Budo Association (USYBA) started training around this time.  In February 1974, Pack began teaching Yoseikan Aikido at the University of Alabama in Tuscaloosa.  Pack continued teaching at the University of Alabama until 1975, when he went to graduate work in Arkansas, leaving the Tuscaloosa class in the hands of Rick Moncrief.

In 1975, Bearden sent a letter to Mochizuki asking for a teacher to be sent to the US. In early 1976, Mochizuki sent Patrick Auge.  Auge had lived in Japan for several years, with four years as an uchi deshi at the Yoseikan, and was at the time a 4th dan.  Auge settled in Ottawa, Ontario in Canada.  He oversaw the already established Yoseikan in the US and began teaching in Canada, with two clubs in Ottawa.  Currently there are 8 schools listed under the International Yoseikan Budo Federation (IYBF) in Canada and the US, most have the word aikido in their title.  The IYBF hombu is in Torrance California under the direction of Patrick Auge, with two other dojos in the US.

The USYBA, while currently affiliated with the Yoseikan World Federation under Hiroo Mochizuki, still maintains its Yoseikan Aikido like syllabus.  The USYBA list seven clubs on their website through the US, some include the term aikido in their title. Another organisation in Canada is called the Canadian Association of Aikido Mochizuki.  Although the term Yoseikan Aikido is not used, the origins of their aikido are with Mochizuki from the Yoseikan.

Australia 
Yoseikan Aikido was the second school of aikido in Australia, and the first in the state of Western Australia. In 1968 a gentleman by the name of Phillipe Boiron began teaching Yoseikan Aikido for Jan de Jong in Perth, Western Australia.  This lead Jan de Jong to travel to Japan in 1969 to train directly under Minoru Mochizuki.  In 1974, on an official request from Jan de Jong, Mochizuki dispatched Yoshiaki Unno to Perth to teach Yoseikan Aikido.  Unno also taught Iaido, Kobudo and Karate.

Almost half of the aikido schools in Perth had some relationship to this early introduction of Yoseikan Aikido in Perth. The Jan de Jong Martial Arts School continues to teach aikido. Hans de Jong, son of the late Jan de Jong and student of Unno, teaches Yoseikan Aikido and is a Shodan. The aikido branch of the UWA Martial Arts Club was started by Unno's student Brett Nener, 4th Dan in Yoseikan Aikido, with Fujimori Akira Shihan of Tanaka ha Butoku Ryu Aikijujutsu as its principal. John Langley principle of the Institute of Aikido Australia, was also a student of Unno's and teaches with 2nd Dan in Yoseikan Aikido Steven Nener and Darren Edwards. Another of Unno's students, Ross Taylor Shihan, 5th Dan, heads the West Coast Aikido Martial Arts Academy in Wangara, Western Australia, and continues the teachings of Minoru Mochizuki and Unno Sensei.

Vietnam
On the 04/07/1963, at 54/14 Nguyen Binh Khiem, Saigon (The center for training martial arts), Master Wanatabe Haruye opened Yoseikan Aikido classes with the master mentor Kazuo Ischikawa (from the French Institute Yoseikan to VietNam to teach Judo). One of the most outstanding disciples of these men was  Mr. Nguyen Dang Duc. And he then became the first President of Aikido Yoseikan Vietnam.

After a period of time two different schools of thought came about relating to the practice and teaching style of Vietnam Aikido Yoseikan,  from that the school split into two branches.

On the 08/10/1968, Master Le Van Nhi established a dojo under the name Aikibudo at the  Sports Club in Saigon (CSS), 55 Red Cross, this is The department of Culture and Labor now.

In 1970, to avoid confusion with the modern Aikido of Morihei Ueshiba O-sensei, Master Nguyen Dang Duc decided to change the name Aikido Yoseikan to Aiki Jujitsu. and this name has been used until now.

After Master Nguyen Dang Duc died, Master Bui Huu Tac became president of Aiki Jujitsu Vietnam and taught several generations of students during his career.

Techniques
Technically Yoseikan Aikido is very similar to other aikido styles.  The fundamental technique, Ikkyo, is referred to as Robuse, or arm rowing. The majority of other aikido techniques are included in Yoseikan Aikido, although some have different names.  The fundamental attack, however, is not shomen uchi, it is an opposite posture single hand grab. Below is a list of common attacks used in Yoseikan, excluding strikes and kicks which encompass all of the basics from karate.  An equivalent Aikikai attack is given in parentheses after the translation.

Attacks
Japanese: English (Aikikai equivalent):
Jun katate dori: Normal single hand grip, axial symmetry (ai hanmi katate dori or kosa dori)
Dosoku katate dori: Normal single hand grip, mirror symmetry (gyaku hanmi katate dori or simply katate dori)
Gyaku katate dori: Reverse single hand grip (none)
Ushiro kubi jime katate dori: rear neck strangle and wrist grab (same or simply ushiro kubi shime)
Ushiro watte kumi tsuki: Rear over arm bear hug (none)
Ushiro shitate kumi tsuki: Rear under arm bear hug (none)
Mae ryote ippon dori: Front two hand on one grasp (morote dori)
Mae ryote dori: Front two hand grasp (ryote dori)
Ushiro ryote dori: Rear two hand grasp (same)
Sode dori: Sleeve grasp (same)
Eri dori: Lapel grasp (mune dori)
Kata dori: Shoulder grasp (same)
Ushiro hiji dori: Rear two on two sleeve grasp (ushiro ryo sode dori)
Ushiro kata dori: Rear two on two shoulder (ushiro ryo kata dori)
Ushiro eri dori: Rear collar grasp (same)
Hadaka jime: Naked strangle (none)
Mae kumi tsuki: Tackle (none)
Eri dori yokomen uchi: Lapel hold side strike
Eri dori sukiage: lapel hold upper cut
 front neck strangle (none)
Mae eri shimeage: Front both hand lapel grab (mune dori)
Mae kami dori: Front hair grab (none)
Tsukami kakari: Attempted strangle (none)

The following is a list of Locks and then throws, again with Aikikai, Yoshinkan, and Shodokan equivalents in parentheses. Please note that these techniques are used as equivalents to Yoseikan techniques for the benefit of those who study a different school of aikido, and are not meant to equate the techniques of other schools.

Locks
Yoseikan: English (Aikikai, Yoshinkan, Shodokan)
Robuse Taoshi: Arm Rowing Takedown (Ikkyo, Ikkajo, Oshi Taoshi)
Hiji Kudaki: Elbow Smash (Rokkyo, Hiji Shime, Waki Gatame)
Kote Kudaki: Wrist Smash (Nikyo, Nikajo, Kote Mawashi)
Yuki Chigai: Under Arm Twist (Sankyo, Sankajo, Kote Hineri)
Shita Ude Garami: Lower Arm Entanglement (Kata Gatame, -, Ude Hineri)
Kata Ha Gaeshi: Single Wing Turnover (Kata Gatame, -, Ude Hineri)
Waki Gatame Hiki Tate: Arm Pit Control ( -, Sankajo Rengyo Ho, - )
Kannuki Hiki Tate: Bolt Lock Control ( -, Hiki Kime, - )

Throws
Yoseikan: English (Aikikai, Yoshinkan, Shodokan)
Kote Gaeshi: Wrist Turnover (same)
Tenbin Nage: Yoke Throw (Ude Kime Nage, Hiji Ate Kokyu Nage, Mae Otoshi)
Shiho Nage: Four Corner Throw (same)
Ue Ude Garami: Upper Arm Entanglement ( -, Ude Garami, Ude Gaeshi)
Gyaku Kote Gaeshi: Reverse Wrist Turnover (same)
Mukae Daoshi: Meeting Takedown (Irimi Nage, Shomen Irimi Nage, - )
Do Gaeshi: Body Overturning (Sayu Nage, Sokumen Irimi Nage, Gyaku Gamae Ate and Gedan Ate)
Ushiro Kata otoshi: Rear Shoulder Drop (Ushiro Udoroshi, -, Ushiro Ate)
Ushiro Sumi Otoshi: Rear Corner Drop (Sumi Otoshi, -, Sumi Otoshi)
Kata Garuma: Shoulder Wheel (Maki Otoshi, -, - )

More techniques exist; the ones listed here have known equivalent techniques in other schools.  The Aikikai and Yoshinkan refer to a lot of techniques as Kokyu Nage, a term which is not used in Yoseikan, all techniques have separate names.  At higher levels the term Aiki Nage is used to describe throws utilising perfect timing, as Kokyu Nage implies, and it is also the term used in Morihei Ueshiba’s Budo Renshu.

Structure

Below is a list of the technical elements which make up Yoseikan Aikido.

 Ukemi: Falling and rolling
 Atemi: Striking methods (karate basics)
 Taisabaki: Body movements (Irimi, etc.)
 Wan Ryoku Yosei: Cultivating energy
 Tehodoki: Hand escapes
 Nigiri Gaeshi: Grip reversals
 Te Waza: Hand techniques
 Uchi Neji Ho: Inward twisting methods (Robuse, Kote Kudaki, Yuki Chigai, etc.)
 Soto Neji Ho: Outer twisting methods (Kote Gaeshi, Shiho Nage, etc.)
 Chokutai Ho: Straight line body methods (Mukae Daoshi, Do Gaeshi, etc.)
 Ude Dori Ho: Arm grabbing methods (Seoi Nage, Ushiro Sumi Otoshi, etc.)
 Ashi Dori Ho: Leg seizing methods (using the hand to grab the leg, e.g. kicking techniques)
 Ashi Waza: Foot techniques (sweeps and reaps from Judo)
 Koshi Waza: Hip techniques (from Judo)
 Sutemi Waza: Sacrifice techniques
 Han Sutemi Waza: Half sacrifice techniques (tori kneels)
 Yoko Sutemi Waza: Side sacrifice techniques (tori lies on side)
 Ma Sutemi Waza: Flat sacrifice techniques (tori lies on back)
 Kime Waza: Restraining Techniques
 Osae Komi: Ground work (from judo)
 Shime Waza: Choking techniques
 Kansetsu Waza: Joint pins
 Kaeshi Waza: Counter techniques
 Renzoku Waza: Combinations and continuation Techniques
 Emono Dori: Weapon taking
 Tanto Dori: Knife taking
 Tachi Dori: Sword taking
 Bo Dori: Staff taking
 Randori:
 Shite Randori: Fixed combat (two attackers, set attack and defence)
 Jyu Randori: Free combat (two attackers, any attack and defence)
 Chigara Randori: Power combat (knife and stick fighting)
 Suwari Waza: Seated techniques
 Han Suwari Waza: Half seated techniques
 Ninin Dori Sanin Dori: 2 person & 3 person grab
 Kenjutsu: Sword Work
 Suburi: Practice cuts
 Kumitachi: Paired sword forms
 Kenjutsu Kata: Sword forms
 Tachi Iai: Standing sword drawing
 Suwari Iai: Kneeling sword drawing
Kata: Solo (striking) and paired (techniques) forms

Kata

Below is a list of Yoseikan Aikido Kata, and the techniques in them.

Solo kata;
Happo Ken no Kata: Form of Eight Fists
The Happo Ken no Kata contains the fundamental striking and blocking techniques. Originally, the kata  was made up of the following movements; 1) soto yoko uke, 2) hiji ate, 3) gedan barai, 4) gedan tsuki, 5) soto barai, 6) chudan tsuki, 7) gedan tsuki uke, 8) jodan tsuki age. The modern version of happo ken has two differences; 4) kubi uchi, 8) hiji ago tsuki age. The kata is said to have come from Shorinji Kempo, which Mochizuki studied while in Mongolia.
Keri Yon Ho no Kata: Form of Four Kicks
The Keri Yon Ho no Kata complements the happo ken, in that it teaches the basic kicking techniques. The kata contains the following movements; 1) mae geri, 2) yoko geri, 3) ushiro geri, 4) mawashi geri. An older version of the kata, call San Bo Geri no Kata, contains only the first three kicks. Another version of the kata, Keri Go Ho no Kata. also includes; 5) ushiro mawashi geri.

Paired kata (attacker and defender);
 Ken Tai Ichi no Kata: Form of Sword and Body as One (sword attack - sword defence; sword attack - sword taking; attack - defence)
 Tsuki - Maki Uchi Kote; Tsuki - Hiji Kudaki; Oitsuki - Hiji Kudaki
 Kote Uchi - Hari Gaeshi Kote Uchi; Kote Giri - Kote Kudaki; Dosoku Katate Dori - Kote Kudaki
 Tsuki - Kubi Suri Komi; Tsuki - Mukae Daoshi; Oitsuki - Mukae Daoshi
 Kubi Giri - Kote Age Kata Uchi; Kubi Giri - Tenbin Nage; Yokomen Uchi - Tenbin Nage
 Maki Uchi Men - Suri Age Do Uchi Ushiro Kata Uchi; Maki Uchi Men - Shiho Nage; Shomen Uchi - Shiho Nage
The Ken Tai Ichi no Kata illustrates the idea that aikido is based on Muto Ryu Kenjutsu. The first part of the five techniques, sword verses sword, demonstrates the kenjutsu form. The second part, sword taking, shows what Mochizuki refers to as the jujutsu forms. Finally, the empty hand techniques are the aikido forms.

Jutsuri no Kata: Forms of Soft Catch (attack - defence)
Mae Ryote Dori - Do Gaeshi
Eri Dori Yokomen Uchi - Hachi Mawashi
Ushiro Kubi Jime Kata Te Dori - Tenbin Nage
Mae Kumi Tsuki - Kata Ha Otoshi
Tsuhari - Hazu Oshi Sutemi
Taisabaki no Kata: Forms of Body Movement (body movement - inside or outside - technique)
Nagashi - Soto - Hiki Otoshi
Nagashi - Uchi - Kubi Otoshi
Hiraki - Soto - Waki Tori
Hiraki - Uchi - Hiza Oshi Taoshi
Irimi - Soto - Mukae Daoshi
Irimi - Uchi - Ko Uchi Gari
Irimi Senkai - Soto - O Soto Gari
Irimi Senkai - Uchi - Kata Guruma
O Irimi Senkai - O Irimi Senkai Ude Domoe
The Taisabaki no Kata demonstrates the use of body movement, with the judo principles of kuzushi (unbalancing), tsukuri (positioning), and gake (throwing). The kata shows how these principles relate to the aikido techniques performed.

Hyori no Kata: Form of Escapes and Counters
Eri Dori Yokomen Uchi
Ushiro Kubi Jime Kata Te Dori
Yuki Chigai
Hiji Kudaki
Robuse
Do Gaeshi
Gyaku Tsuki
Shiho Nage
Tenbin Nage
Mukae Daoshi
Kata Ha Otoshi
Kata Guruma
The Hyori no Kata (lit. Form of Front and Back) demonstrates counter techniques, which have been removed from some aikido schools. The rolls of attacker and defender are continuously being changed. The first attacker, performing eri dori yokomen uchi, escapes the second attack, ushiro kubi jime kata te dori, with yuki chigai. The switching of rolls continues through the kata until the final technique, were the initial defender escapes kata ha otoshi to finally throw the attacker with kata garuma.
Shime Waza Kime no Kata: Form of Chokes
Kansetsu Waza Kime no Kata: Form of Joint Locks
Sutemi Waza no Kata: Form of Sacrifice Throws
Ude Maki
Hiji Hari (Hiji Kake)
Motare Komi Sutemi
Kata Ha Maki
Gyaku Sumi Gaeshi (Oku Eri)
Hazu Oshi
Juji Jime
Yoko Guruma
Sumi Gaeshi (Kata Eri)
Ashi Dori (Ushiro Oku)

See also
Yoseikan
Yoseikan Budo
Aikido
Yoseikan Karate

References

External links

Organisations
 Canadian Association of Aikido Mochizuki
 Yoseikan Aikido in Mississauga, Canada
 Germany Association of Aikido Mochizuki
 International Federation of Nippon Budo
 International Yoseikan Budo Federation
 United States Yoseikan Budo Association
 Yoseikan Hombu Dojo
 Yoseikan Japan official web site
 Yoseikan World Federation
 Dutch Yoseikan Organisation
 Aikido Global Network
 Aikido Aikijujutsu Yoseikan Australia

Aikido organizations